The Codex Agobardinus is a collection, dating from the 9th century, of the works of Christian author Tertullian. It is named after its first owner, the Bishop Agobard of Lyons. He gave it to the Cathedral of Saint Stephen in Lyons, and the parchment codex remained there until the mid-16th century. It was damaged at some point, and the rear portion is  missing. The missing parts are revealed by the table of contents in the front.

It currently resides in the Bibliothèque nationale de France in Paris.

Contents
table of contents
Ad Nationes, I & II
De Praescriptione Haereticorum (incomplete)
Scorpiace
De Testimonio Animae
De Corona
De Spectaculis
De idololatria (incomplete) 
De Anima (incomplete)
De Oratione (incomplete)
De cultu feminarum (incomplete)
Ad uxorem
De exhortatione castitatis
De carne Christi (incomplete)

External link & reference
 Codex Agobardinus
 Codex Agobardinus at Gallica

9th-century manuscripts